Marcel Nicolás Román Núñez (born 7 February 1988, in Montevideo) is an Uruguayan footballer who plays for Rampla Juniors.

Career

Club career
After a year without club, Román returned to the pitch in January 2020, signing with Bolivian Primera División club Real Santa Cruz. He left the club in July 2021. Shortly after, he joined Rampla Juniors.

References

External links

Profile at Tenfiel Digital 

1988 births
Living people
Uruguayan footballers
Uruguay under-20 international footballers
Uruguayan expatriate footballers
Danubio F.C. players
Peñarol players
Genoa C.F.C. players
Iraklis Thessaloniki F.C. players
C.A. Cerro players
C.A. Bella Vista players
A.C. Prato players
Rampla Juniors players
Oriente Petrolero players
Real Santa Cruz players
Uruguayan Primera División players
Serie A players
Serie B players
Bolivian Primera División players
Association football midfielders
Footballers from Montevideo
Uruguayan expatriate sportspeople in Italy
Uruguayan expatriate sportspeople in Bolivia
Uruguayan expatriate sportspeople in Greece
Expatriate footballers in Italy
Expatriate footballers in Bolivia
Expatriate footballers in Greece